Meropliosepsis is a genus of flies in the family Sepsidae. The genus contains the single species Meropliosepsis sexsetosa.

References

Sepsidae
Diptera of South America
Taxa named by Oswald Duda
Brachycera genera
Monotypic Diptera genera